Theodoxus valentinus is a species of freshwater gastropod in the nerite family, native to natural freshwater channels in Valencia, Spain. This species was believed extinct, but has recently been rediscovered to persist in small populations in three different sites.

Description 
T. valentinus has a globose shell with four whorls, the last of which occupies much of the shell, and well-developed columnar callosity. The deep groove of the largest whorl and the wavy form of its aperture distinguish it from other Spanish Theodoxus. The shell is highly variable in color, though mostly ranging from deep purple to bright red, with striped and solidly-decorated forms.

Ecology and threats 
T. valentinus requires highly oxygenated water with a high calcium content of a temperature ranging between 16-18ºC; this specialization makes this species highly susceptible to water pollution and changes in environmental conditions such as drought and water extraction. Its susceptibility to habitat loss has paired with damage from invasive species. The species was highly abundant in the original sites until the 1980s, when the species faced significant declines which have not slowed. The species is now only known from three sites along a 10 x 2 km stretch of the Rio Verdu, extirpated from its original Los Santos River habitat. This species is listed as Critically Endangered on the IUCN Red List. 

T. valentinus lays many oval-shaped eggs 0.8-1 mm in diameter on hard substrates (those on which it feeds) of which only one hatches. Reproduction occurs throughout the year. T. valentinus is predated actively upon by ostracods. Longevity among T. valentinus ranges from 17.8-22 months.

References 

Neritidae